James Donald Wade (August 10, 1928 – June 7, 2007) was an American football coach and college athletics administrator. He served as the head coach at Tennessee Technological University from 1968 to 1982, compiling a record of 81–78–3. Wade was also the athletic director at Tennessee Tech from 1974 to 1980.

A native of Tyronza, Arkansas, Wade played college football at Clemson University as a linebacker from 1950 to 1952 for head coach Frank Howard. He served as an assistant coach at his alma mater under Howard from 1953 to 1967. Wade died on June 7, 2006, in Clemson, South Carolina.

Head coaching record

References

External links
 

1928 births
2007 deaths
American football linebackers
Clemson Tigers football coaches
Clemson Tigers football players
Tennessee Tech Golden Eagles athletic directors
Tennessee Tech Golden Eagles football coaches
People from Poinsett County, Arkansas
Coaches of American football from Arkansas
Players of American football from Arkansas